Pallas and Arachne, also known as Minerva Punishing Arachne and occasionally referred to as Arachne Punished by Pallas, is an oil-on-board oil study by the Flemish artist Peter Paul Rubens completed in 1636 or 1637.

It was a study for one of the series of paintings Rubens and his workshop painted for the Torre de la Parada, which is now lost.

Description 
The painting depicts the story from Ovid's Metamorphoses of the weaving contest between the god Athena and the mortal Arachne. In the original myth, Athena challenges Arachne and loses, but Athena punishes Arachne anyway for insulting the gods by not recognizing the divine source of Athena's artistic skill and for creating a more beautiful work than her own.

In the background of the canvas hangs a partially-visible tapestry of Titian's The Rape of Europa which, according to Ovid's version of the story, was the theme of the tapestry woven by Athena during the contest with Arachne.

Influence 

Rubens's Pallas and Arachne was copied by Juan Bautista Martínez del Mazo, the Spanish Baroque painter and son-in-law of Diego Velázquez. Velázquez positioned Mazo's copy of Pallas and Arachne behind him during his composition of Las Meninas, which he paired with another painting about different contest of the arts between gods and mortals (Apollo as Victor over Pan). The copy of Pallas and Arachne was then painted into the background of the scene in Las Meninas, which would go on to be one of the most recognized and analyzed canvases in the history of western art.

A copy by Rubens of Velázquez's favorite work, Titian's The Rape of Europa, was owned by The Royal Collection of Philip IV. The work can be seen in the background of Pallas and Arachne, which in turn can be seen in the background of Las Meninas.

References

1637 paintings
Baroque paintings
Paintings depicting Greek myths
Mythological paintings by Peter Paul Rubens
1630s paintings
Paintings based on Metamorphoses